Héctor Manuel Moya Cessa (born 27 June 1966) is a physicist specialising in quantum optics. He is currently a researcher/lecturer at Instituto Nacional de Astrofísica, Optica y Electrónica, in Tonantzintla, Puebla, Mexico.

Life
Born in Acayucan, Veracruz, Mexico, Moya Cessa performed work on his PhD with Professor Sir Peter Knight at Imperial College (1990-1993).

He has been awarded several prizes, including the ICO-ICTP Prize and the Science Research Prize of the  Mexican Academy of Sciences, both in 2006. In 2021, he was awarded the Marcos Moshinsky Medal by UNAM's Instituto de Física.

He served as President of the Division of Quantum Information of the Mexican Physical Society from 2011 to 2013.

From 1996 to 2015, he was a Regular Associate of the International Centre for Theoretical Physics.

He has published important works on the generation of non-classical states of the quantized electromagnetic field and in trapped ions. He has also studied analogies between classical and quantum systems in waveguide arrays and with coworkers has experimentally shown how to perform the discrete Fourier transform (DFT) in these type of systems. Using this he has shown that precisely the DFT of a number operator in an s-dimensional Hilbert space corresponds to the best definition of a phase operator in quantum optics: the Pegg and Barnett phase operator (see David Pegg).

In classical optics he has shown that the Bohm potential can be used to explain the Gouy phase. He has also shown that a GRIN medium, when studied beyond the paraxial approximation, generates an analogy with a quantum Kerr medium. By being able to generate non-classical states such as Schrödinger's cats (superposition of coherent states), separation of a Gaussian beam can be generated in this way without the use of beam splitters.

He has written three books involving Quantum Optics, Differential equations and Perturbation theory:
 
 
 

He is a Fellow of the Alexander von Humboldt Foundation and  the Mexican Academy of Sciences.

References

Living people
1966 births
Mexican physicists
Universidad Autónoma Metropolitana alumni
People from Veracruz